Guy Eric Dano (born 2 April 1989) is an Ivorian professional footballer who plays as a defender for Calcutta Football League side Rainbow AC.

Career

Club
Guy Eric Dano's career began in Côte dé Ivory Professional League with top division of the Ivorian Football Federation club jeunesse Club d'Abidjan in 2015. who boost the likes of former Côte d'Ivoire goalkeeper Vincent Angban and Guinea international striker Demba Camara. He is generally strong as a left footer.

Later he came to India to join the I-League side Minerva Punjab in 2017. He played a total of 18 matches for the club and scored 1 goal.

In 2018, he signed for Calcutta Football League side New Barrackpore Rainbow.

Honours
Minerva Punjab
I-League: 2017–18

References

External links 

1989 births
Living people
Ivorian footballers
Association football defenders
RoundGlass Punjab FC players
Calcutta Football League players